Irina-Camelia Begu is the defending champion.

Alexandra Dulgheru won the title, defeating Yulia Putintseva in the final, 6–3, 1–6, 7–5.

Seeds

Main draw

Finals

Top half

Bottom half

References 
 Main draw

Lorraine Open 88 - Singles